Agarista agricola, the Joseph's coat moth, is a medium-sized moth of the family Noctuidae. The species was first described by Edward Donovan in 1805. It is found in Australia.

References

External links
 

Moths of Australia
Agaristinae
Moths described in 1805